This is a partially sorted list of notable persons who have had ties to the University of Ljubljana.

Distinguished faculty

Architecture 
 Jože Plečnik
 Edvard Ravnikar
 Ivan Vurnik

The arts
 Božidar Jakac, drawing and graphics
 Boris Kalin, sculpture
 Gojmir Anton Kos, painting
 Pino Mlakar, performing arts

Economics, administration and political science
 Mihael Brejc, public administration
 Milko Brezigar, economics
 Vlado Dimovski, economics and management
 Andrej Gosar, economics and political theory
 Dušan Mramor, economics
 Dušan Radonjič, economics
 Dimitrij Rupel, international relations
 Gregor Virant, public administration

Humanities and social sciences
 Miran Božovič, philosophy
 Tatjana Bregant, prehistoric archaeology
 Milan Brglez, political theory, international relations
 Aleš Debeljak, cultural studies
 Božidar Debenjak, philosophy
 Mladen Dolar, philosophy
 Mitja Ferenc, history
 Arturo Gavazzi, geography
 Christian Gostečnik, theology and psychology
 Bogo Grafenauer, Medieval history
 Vekoslav Grmič, theology
 Miran Hladnik, literary historian
 Toussaint Hočevar, economic history
 Gert Hofmann, German literature
 Dean Komel, philosophy
 Milko Kos, history
 Avgust Pavel, ethnology and philology
 Dušan Pirjevec, comparative literature
 Janko Pleterski, history
 Igor Pribac, philosophy of history
 Janko Prunk, history
 Rado Riha, philosophy and psychoanalysis
 Franc Rode, theology
 Dimitrij Rupel, sociology, international relations
 Vasko Simoniti, history
 Igor Škamperle, cultural sociology
 Peter Štih, history
 Anton Stres, theology
 Gregor Tomc, sociology
 Aleš Ušeničnik, theology
 Marta Verginella, history
 Sergij Vilfan, legal history
 Peter Vodopivec, history
 Adela Žgur, German and English literature
 Slavoj Žižek, philosophy
 Alenka Zupančič, philosophy
 Fran Zwitter, history

Law 
 France Bučar, law and public administration
 Boris Furlan, philosophy of Law
 Peter Jambrek, Constitutional Law
 Leonid Pitamic, philosophy of Law
 Danilo Türk, international law

Linguistics
 Dalibor Brozović
 Janez Orešnik
 Marko Snoj
 Jože Toporišič
 Zinka Zorko

Mathematics
 Josip Globevnik
 Dragan Marušič
 Marko Petkovšek
 Josip Plemelj

Medicine
Bojan Accetto, gerontology
Milan Pogačnik, veterinary medicine

Natural sciences
 France Adamič, biology
 Robert Blinc, physics
 Matija Gogala, biology
 Anton Peterlin, physics
 Wojciech Rubinowicz, theoretical physics
 Janez Strnad, physics
 Martin Čopič, physics

Technology 
 Ivan Bratko, computer science
 Bojan Kraut, civil engineering 
 Tomaž Pisanski, computer science
 Franc Solina, computer science
 Denis Trček, computer science
 Milan Vidmar, electrical engineering
 Blaž Zupan, computer science

Notable alumni

Architects 
 Marjetica Potrč
 Edvard Ravnikar
 Vojteh Ravnikar

Artists
 Stojan Batič, sculptor
 Janez Lapajne, film director
 Miljenko Licul, designer
 Adriana Maraž, painter
 Pino Mlakar, choreographer

Authors
 France Balantič, poet
 Vladimir Bartol, writer
 Matej Bor, poet
 Ivo Brnčić, author and critic
 Aleš Debeljak, poet and sociologist
 Jože Javoršek, playwright and essayist
 Edvard Kocbek, poet
 Srečko Kosovel, poet
 Juš Kozak, writer
 Primož Kozak, playwright and essayist
 Feri Lainšček, novelist and screenwriter
 Iztok Osojnik, poet
 Žarko Petan, essayist
 Alojz Rebula, writer and essayist
 Tomaž Šalamun, poet
 Dušan Šarotar, writer, literary critic and editor
 Rudi Šeligo, novelist, playwright and politician
 Peter Semolič, poet
 Anja Štefan, writer, poet and story teller
 Aleš Šteger, poet
 Bojan Štih, stage director, literary critic and essayist

Businessmen
Filip Smrekar Apih
Zoran Janković

Law
Ljuba Prenner (1906-1977) noted criminal attorney and author of the first crime novel published in Slovenia.

Physicians 
Bojan Accetto
Janez Janež
Milan Pogačnik

Politicians and diplomats
 Janez Drnovšek, President of Slovenia 2002-2007
 Mitja Gaspari, economist and politician
 Peter Jambrek, sociologist, jurist and politician
 Janez Janša, politician
 Iztok Jarc, diplomat and politician
 Romana Jordan Cizelj, Member of European Parliament
 Jelko Kacin, politician
 Milan Kučan, President of Slovenia
 Dragutin Mate, diplomat and politician
 Mojca Drčar Murko, journalist and Member of the European Parliament
 Ljudmila Novak, Member of European Parliament
 Borut Pahor, politician
 Lojze Peterle, politician, head of the first democratic Government of Slovenia
 Milan Pogačnik, politician
 Janez Potočnik, European Commissioner
 Jože Pučnik, dissident, sociologist, president of the DEMOS coalition
 Anton Rop, former Prime Minister of Slovenia
 Dimitrij Rupel, Foreign Minister of Slovenia, writer
 Matjaž Šinkovec, diplomat and politician
 Jožef Školč, politician
 Danilo Türk, diplomat; former Assistant Secretary-General for Political Affairs for the United Nations; President of Slovenia
 Milan Zver, politician, sociologist and political scientist
 Melania Trump, Former First Lady of the United States

Scientists and academians
 Robert Blinc, physicist
 Katja Boh, sociologist, diplomat and politician
 Davorin Dolar, chemist
 Mladen Dolar, philosopher
 Draga Garašanin, prehistorian and archaeologist
 Boris M. Gombač, historian
 Andreja Gomboc, astrophysicist
 Bogo Grafenauer, historian
 Taras Kermauner, literary theoretician and historian
 Milan Komar, philosopher
 Rado Lenček, Professor of Slavic Studies at Columbia University
 Jure Leskovec, computer scientist
 Oto Luthar, historian
 Vasilij Melik, historian
 Janez Orešnik, linguist
 Jože Pirjevec, historian
 Janko Pleterski, historian, diplomat and politician
 Dušan Repovš, mathematician
 Rado Riha, philosopher
 Renata Salecl, legal theorist 
 Ljubo Sirc, economist, professor at Glasgow University
 Simona Škrabec, literary theorist; professor at the Autonomous University of Barcelona
 Anton Strle, theologian
 Janez Strnad, physicist
 Gregor Tomc, sociologist and musician
 Ivan Vidav, mathematician
 Milica Kacin Wohinz, historian
 Egon Zakrajšek, computer scientist
 Slavoj Žižek, philosopher
 Alenka Zupančič, philosopher
 Fran Zwitter, historian

Others
 Janez Gradišnik, translator
 Bruno Parma, chess player and Grandmaster
 Alenka Puhar, columnist, historian, political activist

See also 
Education in Slovenia
List of people from Ljubljana

References

Ljubljana
People
University